The following is a list of famous supercentenarians (people who have attained the age of at least 110 years) notable for reasons other than just longevity. As such, this list does not include every person who has reached this age. For more lists of centenarians, see lists of centenarians. People highlighted in blue are living.

See also
For people known just for their longevity, 
 List of the verified oldest people
 List of the oldest living people

References